Áporka is a village in Pest county, Hungary.

Twin towns - twin cities
  Visaginas – Lithuania

References

Notes

Populated places in Pest County